The 11th César Awards ceremony, presented by the Académie des Arts et Techniques du Cinéma, honoured the best French films of 1985 and took place on 22 February 1986 at the Palais des Congrès in Paris. The ceremony was chaired by Madeleine Renaud and Jean-Louis Barrault and hosted by Michel Drucker. Three Men and a Cradle won the award for Best Film.

Winners and nominees
The winners are highlighted in bold:

Best Film:Three Men and a Cradle, directed by Coline SerreauL'Effrontée, directed by Claude MillerPéril en la demeure, directed by Michel DevilleSans toit ni loi, directed by Agnès VardaSubway, directed by Luc Besson
Best Foreign Film: The Purple Rose of Cairo, directed by Woody AllenDesperately Seeking Susan, directed by Susan SeidelmanThe Killing Fields, directed by Roland JofféRan, directed by Akira KurosawaYear of the Dragon, directed by Michael Cimino
Best First Work:Le Thé au harem d'Archimède, directed by Mehdi CharefHarem, directed by Arthur JofféLa Nuit porte-jarretelles, directed by Virginie ThévenetStrictement personnel, directed by Pierre Jolivet
Best Actor:Christopher Lambert, for SubwayRobin Renucci, for Escalier CMichel Serrault, for On ne meurt que 2 foisGérard Depardieu, for PoliceLambert Wilson, for Rendez-vous
Best Actress:Sandrine Bonnaire, for Sans toit ni loiCharlotte Rampling, for On ne meurt que 2 foisNicole Garcia, for Péril en la demeureJuliette Binoche, for Rendez-vousIsabelle Adjani, for Subway
Best Supporting Actor:Michel Boujenah, for 3 hommes et un couffinXavier Deluc, for On ne meurt que 2 foisJean-Hugues Anglade, for SubwayJean-Pierre Bacri, for SubwayMichel Galabru, for Subway  
Best Supporting Actress:Bernadette Lafont, for L'Effrontée Dominique Lavanant, for 3 hommes et un couffinCatherine Frot, for Escalier CAnémone, for Péril en la demeureMacha Méril, for Sans toit ni loi 
Most Promising Actor: Wadeck Stanczak, for Rendez-vousJean-Philippe Écoffey, for L'EffrontéeLucas Belvaux, for Poulet au vinaigreJacques Bonnaffé, for La Tentation d'IsabelleKader Boukhanef, for Le Thé au harem d'Archimède  
Most Promising Actress: Charlotte Gainsbourg, for L'EffrontéePhilippine Leroy-Beaulieu, for 3 hommes et un couffinEmmanuelle Béart, for L'Amour en douceZabou Breitman, for Billy Ze KickCharlotte Valandrey, for Rouge baiser  
Best Director:Michel Deville, for Péril en la demeureColine Serreau, for 3 hommes et un couffinClaude Miller, for L'EffrontéeAgnès Varda, for Sans toit ni loiLuc Besson, for Subway
Best Writing:Coline Serreau, for 3 hommes et un couffinAnnie Miller, Luc Béraud, Bernard Stora, Claude Miller, for L'EffrontéeJacques Deray, Michel Audiard, for On ne meurt que 2 foisMichel Deville, for Péril en la demeureAndré Téchiné, Olivier Assayas, for Rendez-vous 
Best Cinematography: Jean Penzer, for On ne meurt que 2 foisPasqualino De Santis, for HaremRenato Berta, for Rendez-vousCarlo Varini, for Subway
Best Costume Design: Olga Berluti, Catherine Gorne-Achdjian, for HaremChristian Dior, Elisabeth Tavernier, for Jacqueline Bouchard, for L'EffrontéeChristian Gasc, for Rendez-vous 
Best Sound:Gérard Lamps, Luc Perini, Harrik Maury, Harald Maury, for SubwayPaul Lainé, Gérard Lamps, for L'EffrontéeDominique Hennequin, Pierre Gamet, for HaremJean-Louis Ughetto, Dominique Hennequin, for Rendez-vous
Best Editing:Raymonde Guyot, for Péril en la demeureHenri Lanoë, for On ne meurt que 2 foisYann Dedet, for PoliceSophie Schmit, for Subway  
Best Music: Ástor Piazzolla, José Luis Castiñeira de Dios, for Tangos, l'exil de GardelMichel Portal, for Claude Bolling, for On ne meurt que 2 foisÉric Serra, for Subway
Best Production Design: Alexandre Trauner, for Subway Jean-Jacques Caziot, for François de Lamothe, for On ne meurt que 2 foisPhilippe Combastel, for Péril en la demeure
Best Animated Short:L'Enfant de la haute mer, directed by Patrick DeniauLa Campagne est si belle, directed by Michel GauthierContes crépusculaires, directed by Yves Charnay 
Best Fiction Short:Grosse, directed by Brigitte RoüanLa Consultation, directed by Radovan TadicDialogue de sourds, directed by Bernard NauerJuste avant le mariage, directed by  Jacques DeschampsLe Livre de Marie, directed by Anne-Marie Miéville
Best Documentary Short:New York, N.Y., directed by Raymond DepardonLa Boucane, directed by Jean GaumyC'était la dernière année de ma vie, directed by Claude Weisz 
Best French Language Film:Derborence, directed by Francis Reusser Vivement ce soir, directed by Patrick Van Antwerpen 
Honorary César:Cinémathèque FrançaiseBette DavisJean DelannoyRené FerracciShoah, directed by Claude Lanzmann

See also
 58th Academy Awards
 39th British Academy Film Awards

External links
 Official website
 
 11th César Awards at AlloCiné

1986
1986 film awards
Cesar